Pegolettia is a genus of African plants in the tribe Inuleae within the family Asteraceae.

 Species

References

Asteraceae genera
Inuleae
Flora of Africa